Casey DeSmith (born August 13, 1991) is an American professional ice hockey goaltender for the Pittsburgh Penguins of the National Hockey League (NHL). He holds the Wilkes-Barre/Scranton Penguins record for most saves in a playoff game. DeSmith was named to the AHL's 2016–17 All-Rookie Team and was a co-recipient of the 2017 Harry "Hap" Holmes Memorial Award.

Playing career

Junior
DeSmith played junior hockey in the NEPSAC league for Berwick Academy from 2006 to 2008. After one season with Deerfield Academy, he joined the Indiana Ice of the United States Hockey League, where he earned a 0.911 save percentage, a 2.80 GAA, and three shutouts in 64 regular season games.

College
DeSmith studied business at the University of New Hampshire, where he played hockey for the Wildcats from 2011 to 2014. In his first season, he compiled a 9–10–1 overall record. He earned his first college career shut-out on January 11, 2011. At the end of his first season, he had a 2.33 GAA while earning a 0.926 save percentage. He recorded 30 or more saves on ten separate occasions throughout the regular season. He had a career high 50 saves in the Hockey East quarterfinals against Boston University on March 11, 2012. He was named Hockey East Defensive Player of the Week for the week of February 6, 2012, was named Hockey East Rookie of the Week for the week of January 11, 2012. He was also twice honored as the Service Credit Union Student-Athlete of the Week for the week of February 13, 2012 and for the week of March 5, 2012. He was later named to the Hockey East All-Rookie team for the 2011–12 season.

Arrest and expulsion
In September 2014, DeSmith was arrested for assaulting a woman who either was or had formerly been his girlfriend. He was suspended from the team immediately after his arrest, and he eventually was permanently dismissed.

DeSmith accepted a plea bargain on December 4, 2014. He pleaded not guilty to all charges against him (including domestic abuse) with the exception of a single count of disorderly conduct.  Under New Hampshire law, "disorderly conduct" is considered a violation rather than a misdemeanor. He was sentenced to a $124 fine and twelve months of probation. He also signed a diversion agreement that included community service, which would lead to all charges being formally dismissed after twelve months. DeSmith met the terms of his plea bargain and stayed out of further trouble. He was never reinstated as a UNH Wildcats hockey player (although he continued to be enrolled as a student), and he did not play anywhere else all season.

DeSmith applied for a waiver transfer, so he could play for another school, but the NCAA denied his request.  According to DeSmith, several other schools were interested in him.

Professional
On June 30, 2015, DeSmith signed a contract for the 2015–16 season with an ECHL team, the Wheeling Nailers, after the NCAA denied a transfer waiver to play a senior season of college hockey. He would have been ineligible to play college hockey after 2015-2016, because the NCAA normally only allows student-athletes five academic years to use up their standard four seasons of eligibility.

DeSmith would appear in just thirteen total games with the Nailers' 2015–16 Eastern Conference Championship team, posting a 5–2–2 record, a 2.55 goals against average, and a 0.915 save percentage.

On January 3, 2016, DeSmith was loaned to the Nailers' American Hockey League (AHL) affiliate, the Wilkes-Barre/Scranton Penguins. He played his first game for the WBS Penguins on December 26, 2015, against the Hershey Bears, stopping all seven shots he faced during his 20 minutes of play. He earned his first win in his first career AHL start on January 3, 2016, against the Hartford Wolf Pack, stopping 22 of 24 shots. He got his first shutout on April 1, 2017, making twenty-six saves against the Lehigh Valley Phantoms.

DeSmith started the three final games of the 2015–16 AHL season. He won all three games with a 0.950 save percentage. He won his first professional playoff game during the Calder Cup Playoffs on April 20, 2016, against the Providence Bruins. Three days later, he set a Wilkes-Barre/Scranton record for most saves in a playoff game facing 59 shots. The double overtime win clinched the Penguins' fourth division crown as the #1 ranked team in the Eastern Conference. However, the Penguins would ultimately fall to the Hershey Bears.

On July 4, 2016, DeSmith signed a contract directly with the Wilkes-Barre/Scranton Penguins. He would play in 29 games for the WBS Penguins during the 2016–17 season. He finished the regular season at the top of the AHL with a 2.01 goals against average and a 0.926 save percentage. He started all five playoff games for the Penguins after partner Tristan Jarry was called up to Pittsburgh during the 2017 Stanley Cup playoffs. He and Jarry would end the season as the best goaltending tandem in the AHL. The duo was awarded the 2017 Harry "Hap" Holmes Award, for the goaltenders of an AHL team with the lowest goals against average. DeSmith was voted to the AHL's 2016–17 All-Rookie Team, along with teammate Jake Guentzel. After the Wilkes-Barre/Scranton season ended, DeSmith returned to Pittsburgh and served as a "Black Ace" during the Pittsburgh Penguins' 2017 Stanley Cup run.

On July 1, 2017, DeSmith signed his first NHL contract (one-year, two-way) with the Pittsburgh Penguins. He started the 2017–18 AHL season with a 3–0 record with a 0.98 goals against average, a 0.965 save percentage, and one shutout. He ranked second in the AHL in goal-against average and third in save percentage. On October 23, 2017, executive vice president and general manager Jim Rutherford announced that the Penguins had recalled DeSmith from Wilkes-Barre/Scranton. He played in his first NHL game on October 29, 2017 against the Winnipeg Jets at Bell MTS Place after head coach Mike Sullivan pulled starting goaltender Matt Murray in the first period. In doing so, he became the 62nd former Nailer/Thunderbird to reach the NHL and the first member of the 2015–16 Eastern Conference Championship team to reach the NHL. 10 seconds into DeSmith's NHL debut, he faced his first career shot, a goal by forward Blake Wheeler. In the end, DeSmith made twelve out of fifteen saves in a little over forty minutes of play. He made his first NHL save against forward Patrik Laine. On October 30, 2017, he was reassigned back to the Wilkes-Barre/Scranton Penguins.

DeSmith was recalled on November 28, 2017, to play backup to Jarry after starting goaltender Matt Murray was injured. In a game against the Toronto Maple Leafs on December 9, he filled in for Jarry in the second period marking his second NHL appearance. Despite his efforts, the Penguins ended up losing 3–4. He was reassigned to the Wilkes-Barre/Scranton Penguins a game later as Murray was activated from injured reserve.

DeSmith was again recalled to the Penguins on January 12, 2018. On January 18, 2018, DeSmith made his first NHL start and earned his first NHL win, stopping 28 of 29 shots in a 3–1 win over the Los Angeles Kings. Despite his success, he was reassigned to Wilkes-Barre/Scranton on February 4, 2018. On February 26, Pittsburgh recalled DeSmith, once again switching with Jarry for the backup goaltender position. He recorded his first career shutout on April 6, 2018, to help the Penguins clinch home ice advantage for Game 1 of the 2018 Stanley Cup playoffs.

During the 2018–19 season, having established himself in the backup role for the Penguins, DeSmith was signed to a three-year, $3.75 million contract extension with Pittsburgh on January 11, 2019.

DeSmith was sent back to Wilkes-Barre at the beginning of the 2019–20 season because the Penguins preferred to keep Jarry on the roster as the backup goaltender. The Penguins wanted to call up DeSmith on January 4, 2020. However, the game that night was at Montreal, and DeSmith was unable to travel to Canada because he had misplaced his passport. Emil Larmi was called up from the ECHL's Wheeling Nailers instead.

In the pandemic-shortened 2020–21 season, DeSmith served as full-time backup to Jarry for the Penguins, compiling an 11–7–0 record in starts with a .912 save percentage. The following season, he had an 11–6–5 record during the regular season with an .914 save percentage. DeSmith found himself in the spotlight when Jarry injured his foot shortly before the beginning of the 2022 Stanley Cup playoffs, elevating him to the starting goaltender position. In his first ever NHL playoff start in Game 1 of the first round series against the New York Rangers, DeSmith made 48 saves on 51 shots in the course of regulation time and two periods of overtime. Midway through double overtime he was forced to exit the game, ceding the net to Louis Domingue. Days later, it was announced that DeSmith had required core muscle surgery and would miss the remainder of the playoffs.

On July 5, 2022, the Penguins re-signed DeSmith to a two-year, $3.6 million contract.

Personal life
DeSmith was born on August 13, 1991, in Rochester, New Hampshire to Gary and Patrice DeSmith. DeSmith is married to his wife, Mollie. He has two sisters, Kylene and Kirin. He enjoys disc golf in his free time.

Records
 Most saves in a playoff game (59), Wilkes-Barre/Scranton

Career statistics

Awards and honors

References

External links
 

1991 births
Living people
American men's ice hockey goaltenders
Ice hockey people from New Hampshire
Indiana Ice players
New Hampshire Wildcats men's ice hockey players
People from Rochester, New Hampshire
Pittsburgh Penguins players
Sportspeople from Strafford County, New Hampshire
Undrafted National Hockey League players
Wheeling Nailers players
Wilkes-Barre/Scranton Penguins players